Analyta vansomereni is a moth in the family Crambidae. It was described by Tams in 1932. It is found in Kenya.

References

Endemic moths of Kenya
Moths described in 1932
Spilomelinae
Moths of Africa